Perroncito is an Italian surname. Notable people with the surname include:

Aldo Perroncito (1882–1929), Italian pathologist
Edoardo Perroncito (1847–1936), Italian parasitologist, father of Aldo

Italian-language surnames